Inch is a village in County Clare, in Ireland. Inch townland is located five minutes drive from the county council administrative centre, Ennis. The village is on the R474 Ennis to Milltown Malbay road. Inch has a church, primary school and several bed and breakfasts. No shops are left.

The village of Inch is in the parish of Inch and Kilmaley in the Roman Catholic Diocese of Killaloe. Parish churches are Our Lady of the Wayside in Inch, St John the Baptist in Kilmaley and St Michael the Archangel in Connolly.

See also
Inch, County Wexford

References

Towns and villages in County Clare